Buitrago is a surname. Notable people with the surname include:

Carlos Buitrago (born 1991), Nicaraguan boxer
Daniel Buitrago (born 1991), Colombian football player
Fanny Buitrago (born 1943), Colombian fiction writer and playwright 
Guillermo Buitrago (1920-1949), Colombian composer and songwriter
Hernando Buitrago (born 1970), Colombian football referee
Ricardo Buitrago (born 1985), Panamanian footballer
Roberto Buitrago (born 1937), Colombian road racing cyclist